Alphonso Lingis (born November 23, 1933) is an American philosopher, writer and translator, with Lithuanian roots, currently Professor Emeritus of Philosophy at Pennsylvania State University. His areas of specialization include phenomenology, existentialism, modern philosophy, and ethics. Lingis is also known as a photographer, and he complements the philosophical themes of many of his books with his own photography.

Career 
Lingis attended Loyola University in Chicago, then pursued graduate studies at the Catholic University of Leuven in Belgium. His doctoral dissertation, written under Alphonse de Waelhens, was a discussion of the French phenomenologists Maurice Merleau-Ponty and Jean-Paul Sartre. Returning to the United States, Lingis joined the faculty at Duquesne University in Pittsburgh. In the mid-1960s he moved to Penn State University, where he published numerous scholarly articles on the history of philosophy, developing a passionate engagement with Continental philosophy that would prove vital to his later book career. Lingis also began working at his translation projects, and over the years, translated authors including Emmanuel Levinas, Maurice Merleau-Ponty, and Pierre Klossowski.
	
His first book was Excesses (1983), which inaugurated a series: anthropological, jet-set, Continental-philosophy-referencing books. In 1994 Lingis published three more books in a single year: The Community of Those Who Have Nothing in Common, Abuses, and Foreign Bodies. In 2000, in his mid-60's, Lingis released Dangerous Emotions, which involved a series of limit-experience “dares” along with references to a broad range of philosophical topics. Later books include Trust (2004), Body Transformations (2005), The First Person Singular (2007), Violence and Splendor (2011) and Irrevocable: A Philosophy of Mortality (2018). In the books listed above, Lingis's philosophical style is visceral, occasionally obscene, and (to say the least) beyond good and evil. Lingis's motto from Abuses (1994) that “The unlived life is not worth examining” is categorically emphasized in these books. Lingis's “phenomenology” monographs, on the other hand, (e.g. The Imperative (1998)) emphasize the Socratic point that “The unexamined life is not worth living.” In many of his books, Alphonso Lingis elaborates an epistemological ethics that broadly affirms Earthly life's polymorphous sexuality. Alphonso Lingis also sometimes writes of a politics of the body which dictates a neo-Foucauldian pain-pleasure nexus in the name of a broad base of access to power and knowledge. Alphonso Lingis rolls left-wing and hedonist, a postmodern Hemingway who lives philosophy and commits it to print.

Books 
 Excesses: Eros and Culture (1983)
 Libido: The French Existential Theories (1985)
 Phenomenological Explanations (1986)
 Deathbound Subjectivity (1989)
 The Community of Those Who Have Nothing in Common (1994)
 Abuses (1994)
 Foreign Bodies (1994)
 Sensation: Intelligibility in Sensibility (1995)
 The Imperative (1998)
 Dangerous Emotions (2000)
 Trust (2004)
 Body Transformations (2005)
 The First Person Singular (2007)
 Wonders Seen in Forsaken Places: An Essay on the Photographs and the Process of Photography of Mark Cohen (2010)
 Contact [photographs] (2010)
 Violence and Splendor (2011)
 The Alphonso Lingis Reader, edited by Tom Sparrow (2018)
 Irrevocable: A Philosophy of Mortality (2018)

Translations (French into English) 
 Emmanuel Levinas, De l’existence à l’existant (1947). Translated by Lingis as Existence and Existents (2001).
 Emmanuel Levinas, Totalité et infini: essai sur l’extériorité (1961). Translated by Lingis as Totality and Infinity: An Essay on Exteriority (1969).
 Emmanuel Levinas, Autrement qu’être ou au-delà de l’essence (1974). Translated by Lingis as Otherwise than Being, or Beyond Essence (Springer, 1991).  
 Maurice Merleau-Ponty, Le visible et l’Invisible (1964). Translated by Lingis as The Visible and the Invisible (1968).
 Pierre Klossowski, Sade, mon prochain (1947). Translated by Lingis as Sade My Neighbor (1991).

Secondary literature 
 Thomas J. Altizer, Edward Casey, Thomas L. Dumm, et al., Encounters with Alphonso Lingis (2003) 
 Bobby George and Tom Sparrow, Itinerant Philosophy: On Alphonso Lingis (2014)
 Randolph Wheeler, Anne Ashbaugh, Wolfgang W. Fuchs, Graham Harman, Alexander E. Hooke, Alphonso Lingis, et al., Passion in Philosophy: Essays in Honor of Alphonso Lingis (2016)
 Alexander E. Hooke, Alphonso Lingis and Existential Genealogy: The First Full Length Study Of The Work Of Alphonso Lingis (2019)

See also
Ecstasy (philosophy)
American philosophy
List of American philosophers
Continental philosophy
Existentialism
Postmodernism

References

External links
 Pennsylvania State University Department of Philosophy
 Official Website
 Alphonso Lingis: The most critical things occur by chance, Interviews with exceptional minds, Eximia

1933 births
Living people
20th-century American philosophers
21st-century American philosophers
Philosophers from Illinois
Philosophers from Pennsylvania
Writers from Pittsburgh
Catholic University of Leuven (1834–1968) alumni
French–English translators
American people of Lithuanian descent
20th-century translators
21st-century translators
People from Crete, Illinois
Levinas scholars
20th-century male writers